Kalandsvatnet is the largest lake in the municipality of Bergen in Vestland county, Norway. The  lake is located in the borough of Fana, just east of the village of Fanahammeren.

See also
List of lakes in Norway

References

Geography of Bergen
Lakes of Vestland